Baby Darling Taporo is the fourth studio album by the neofolk duo Ruby Throat. Promotional music videos were produced for the album including "Hu'u" and "Also Elizabeth, Daughter of the Above."'.

Recording
The album was recorded by vocalist KatieJane Garside and guitarist Chris Whittingham during a voyage around the Marquesas Islands, Niue, Kingdom of Tonga, New Zealand, Saint Helena, and the Azores.

Release
Baby Darling Taporo was released 2 March 2018 on digital, as well as a limited edition 500 copy CD pressing sold by Garside her official website on 9 November 2017.

Track listing

References

External links
Baby Darling Taporo at Rate Your Music

2017 albums